Albert Veera Chey (born December 28,1982) is a Flyweight French Pradal Serey and Muay Thai  kickboxer of Khmer descent on his father's side and of Thai descent on his mother's side.

Career 
March 16, 2013 in Déols, France Explosion Fight Night 7, Albert Veera Chey defeated Gery Bavetta  by unanimous decision to win the ISKA −57kg World Title.

June 25, 2011 in Saint-Nazaire, France Le grand defi, Final, Albert Veera Chey defeated Thong Puindeenaidee by unanimous decision to win the 2011 WMA −57kg World Title.

Championships and awards 

Muay Thai
ISKA
2013 ISKA −57kg World Title

WMA
2011 WMA −57kg World Title

FFSCDA
2011 FFSCDA −57kg National Title

WPMF
2010 WPMF −57kg European Title

FBTMTDA
2008 FBTMTDA −57kg National Title

Kickboxing record

|-  style="background:#cfc;"
| 2014-02-01 || Win ||align=left| Marco De Virgilio || Explosion Fight Night 9 || Déols, France || Decision (Unanimous) || 5 || 3:00
|-  style="background:#cfc;"
| 2013-03-16 || Win ||align=left| Gery Bavetta || Explosion Fight Night 7 || Déols, France || Decision (Unanimous) || 5 || 3:00
|-
! style=background:white colspan=9 |
|-  style="background:#cfc;"
| 2012-11-17 || Win ||align=left| Amine Zitouni || Explosion Fight Night 6 || Châteauroux, France || KO (Left Kick to the Body) || 2 ||
|-  style="background:#fbb;"
| 2012-10-06 || Loss ||align=left| Amine Kacem || TIME FIGHT: Event 2 || Joué-lès-Tours, France || Decision (Unanimous) || 5 || 3:00
|-  style="background:#fbb;"
| 2012-04-07 || Loss ||align=left| David Macintosh || Explosion Fight Night 5 || Déols, France || Decision (Unanimous) || 5 || 3:00
|-  style="background:#cfc;"
| 2011-11-12 || Win ||align=left| Oliver Moriano || Nuit des Champions 2011 || Marseille, France || Decision (Unanimous) || 5 || 3:00
|-  style="background:#cfc;"
| 2011-06-25 || Win ||align=left| Thong Puideenaidee || Le grand defi || Saint-Nazaire, France || Decision (Unanimous) || 5 || 3:00
|-
! style=background:white colspan=9 |
|-  style="background:#cfc;"
| 2011-05-28 || Win ||align=left| Vatsana Sedone || 4e Soiree de Boxe Thai || Montargis, France || Decision (Unanimous) || 5 || 3:00
|-  style="background:#cfc;"
| 2011-05-07 || Win ||align=left| Chokchai Thongsamarith || Finales Championnat De France Muaythai || Paris, France || KO || 2 || 
|-
! style=background:white colspan=9 |
|-  style="background:#cfc;"
| 2010-04-24 || Win ||align=left| Rui Garcia || Fight Night  || Bordeaux, France || KO || 2 || 
|-
! style=background:white colspan=9 |
|-  style="background:#cfc;"
| 2010-02-26 || Win ||align=left| Pradermchai Kaewsamrit || Lumpinee Kerkkrai: Villaume vs Saiyok || Bangkok, Thailand || TKO || 4 ||
|-  style="background:#fbb;"
| 2009-11-28 || Loss ||align=left| Jomthong Chuwattana || A1 Lyon || Lyon, France || Decision || 5 || 3:00
|-  style="background:#cfc;"
| 2009-05-16 || Win ||align=left| Karim Bennoui || Légendes et Guerriers || Toulouse, France || TKO (Referee Stoppage) || 5 ||
|-  style="background:#cfc;"
| 2009-04-11 || Win ||align=left| Patrick Carta || Muay Thai & Pancrase II || Bordeaux, France || Decision (Unanimous) || 5 || 3:00
|-  style="background:#cfc;"
| 2009-02-07 || Win ||align=left| Xavier Bastard || Gala de Boxe Thai de Saumur || Saumur, France || TKO (Referee Stoppage) || 5 ||
|-  style="background:#cfc;"
| 2008-12-06 || Win ||align=left| Anthony Fiorelli || Muaythai : tournoi −60kg || Nantes, France || TKO (Corner Stoppage)  || 1 ||
|-  style="background:#cfc;"
| 2008-12-06 || Win ||align=left| Daoud Medour || Muaythai : tournoi −60kg || Nantes, France || KO  || 2 ||
|-  style="background:#cfc;"
| 2008-06-28 || Win ||align=left| Christophe Tang || Finale du Championnat FBTMTDA || Colombelles, France || KO || ||
|-
! style=background:white colspan=9 |
|-  style="background:#cfc;"
| 2008-06-22 || Win ||align=left| Beut Somkhann || Gala Kun Khmer – Muaythai || Vieux-Condé, France || Decision  || 5 || 3:00
|-  style="background:#fbb;"
| 2008-05-04 || Loss ||align=left| Dmitry Varats || Power of Scotland 4 Tournament Quarter Finals || United Kingdom || Decision || 3 || 3:00
|-  style="background:#cfc;"
| 2007-07-08 || Win ||align=left| Petchmonkong || Kiatsingnoi Fights (Rajadamnern) || Bangkok, Thailand || KO || 4 ||
|-  style="background:#cfc;"
| 2007-03-17 || Win ||align=left| Lorenzo Paoli || The King Of Kings III || Milan, Italy || KO || 3 ||
|-  style="background:#cfc;"
| 2007-01-27 || Win ||align=left| Mounir Bouti || Gala de Saumer || Saumur, France || Decision  || 5 || 3:00
|-  style="background:#cfc;"
| 2006-12-16 || Win ||align=left| Anthony Fiorelli || Super Fight Muay Thai || Bordeaux, France || Decision  || 5 || 3:00
|-  style="background:#cfc;"
| 2006-11-04 || Win ||align=left| Ali Abrayem || Thailand vs Europe || Peruwelz, Belgium || Decision  || 5 || 3:00
|-  style="background:#fbb;"
| 2006-06-17 || Loss ||align=left| Andy Howson || World Class Professional Thai Boxing ||  United Kingdom || Decision  || 5 || 3:00
|-  style="background:#cfc;"
| 2006-05-13 || Win ||align=left| Fred Wyart || Muay Thai & Break Dance Fury || Bordeaux, France || KO || 3 ||
|-  style="background:#fbb;"
| 2006-01-14 || Loss ||align=left| Mounir Bouti || La Nuit des Superfights III || Villebon, France || TKO || 3 ||
|-  style="background:#cfc;"
| 2005 || Win ||align=left| Julio Vargas || Anaitasuna || Spain || Decision (Unanimous) || 5 || 3:00
|-
| colspan=9 | Legend:

References 

1982 births
Living people
French male kickboxers
French Muay Thai practitioners
Bantamweight kickboxers
Flyweight kickboxers
French people of Cambodian descent
French people of Thai descent